Henry Southwell may refer to:

Henry Southwell (politician) (1700–1758), Irish MP for Limerick County
Henry Southwell (bishop) (1860–1937), Anglican Bishop of Lewes